KOAN Sound (named after the word kōan) is an English electronic music production duo from Bristol, consisting of Will Weeks and Jim Bastow.

A track from the Max Out EP is titled "One Hand Clap" – a reference to a well-known kōan with the implied answer of silence. They initially gained recognition as dubstep producers, with earlier popular tracks including "Akira". Some of their many types of music includes glitch hop, neurohop, and Drum & Bass. The duo have since released music on various labels including Inspected Records and Owsla, and have worked with a number of other artists, including producer Asa and singer Ed Sheeran.

Career 
The duo cite bands such as Rage Against the Machine and Incubus as early influences. In 2005 the duo began to explore electronic music through artists such as The Prodigy and Noisia.

On 23 May 2011, KOAN Sound released the Max Out EP. The release was seen by many as a turning point in their production, gradually moving away from the dubstep template of their earlier music and displaying a wider range of styles.

On 1 November 2011, the duo released the Funk Blaster EP on Skrillex's label Owsla. The EP reached number 1 in the Beatport releases category.

During 2012, KOAN Sound performed across Europe and North America. They supported Skrillex alongside Diplo and others on the Full Flex Express Tour in 2012.

On 4 September 2012, The Adventures of Mr. Fox EP was released. The release includes remixes from Reso, Neosignal and Opiuo. A remix of "Introvert" by Vexisle, a duo of KOAN Sound's frequent collaborator Asa and Kursa, was released soon after as a free download. The EP track "80s Fitness" (music video by director Tim Hendrix and producer Filippo Nesci) featured on an advert for The Radio 1 Breakfast Show with Nick Grimshaw and received airplay on BBC Radio 1 and 1Xtra. Their songs have been played by Skream and Benga, MistaJam and Annie Nightingale among others, and they completed a Daily Dose: OWSLA After Dark mix for MistaJam.

On 22 October 2013, the duo's collaboration EP with Asa, Sanctuary, was released through OWSLA and Inspected. This was considered to be another turning point in their production, where they began to incorporate more orchestral, organic and ethereal elements in their music, as well as releasing various tracks that sounded almost completely acoustic.

Their fourth OWSLA release, the Dynasty EP, was released on 1 April 2014. One of the four tracks, "7th Dimension", entered the UK Indie Breakers Chart at number 12.

Their fifth release, Forgotten Myths, was released in 2015 through Culprate's Open Outlets label and Shoshin.

Their sixth release, an album titled Polychrome, was announced on 1 November 2018 and released on 7 December 2018.

On 20 September 2019, they became a featured artist on the rhythm game osu!.

Discography

Albums

Extended plays

Singles

Other appearances

Remixes

References

English electronic music duos
Musical groups established in 2008
Dubstep music groups
Owsla artists
Musical groups from Bristol